Al-Najma Sport Club is an Iraqi football team based in Al-Qādisiyyah. It plays in Iraq Division Two.

Managerial history
 Faleh Abed Hajim
 Ghanem Fadhel
 Mohammed Abed Hani

See also 
 2018–19 Iraq FA Cup
 2019–20 Iraq FA Cup
 2020–21 Iraq FA Cup

References

External links
 Al-Najma SC on Goalzz.com
 Iraq Clubs- Foundation Dates

2003 establishments in Iraq
Association football clubs established in 2003
Football clubs in Al-Qādisiyyah